Genetics is a monthly scientific journal publishing investigations bearing on heredity, genetics, biochemistry and molecular biology. Genetics is published by the Genetics Society of America. It has a delayed open access policy, and makes articles available online without a subscription after 12 months have elapsed since first publication.
Since 2010, it is published online-only.
George Harrison Shull was the founding editor of Genetics in 1916.

Editors-in-Chief

References

External links
Official website

Genetics journals
Delayed open access journals
English-language journals
Publications established in 1916
Online-only journals